Istiblennius spilotus, the spotted rockskipper, is a species of combtooth blenny found in the western Indian ocean. Males of this species can reach a maximum of  TL, while females can reach a maximum length of  SL.

References

spilotus
Fish described in 1994
Taxa named by Victor G. Springer